Homestar or HOME STAR may refer to:
 HOME STAR, a proposed federal program in the United States
 Homestar Runner, an American animated surreal web comedy series
 Homestar Runner (character), the titular character of the series
 Homestar, the home edition of Megastar (projector)